Jatznick is a railway station in the village of Jatznick, Mecklenburg-Vorpommern, Germany. The station lies of the Angermünde–Stralsund railway and the Jatznick–Ueckermünde railway and the train services are operated by Deutsche Bahn. The station was modernised in the 2000s with new platforms and other facilities.

Train services
The station is served by the following services:

Regional services  Stralsund - Greifswald - Pasewalk - Angermünde - Berlin - Ludwigsfelde - Jüterbog - Falkenberg - Elsterwerda
Regional services  Bützow - Neubrandenburg - Pasewalk - Ueckermünde Stadthafen

References

Railway stations in Mecklenburg-Western Pomerania
Railway stations in Germany opened in 1863
Buildings and structures in Vorpommern-Greifswald